Terrence Dashon Howard (born March 11, 1969) is an American actor, rapper, singer, and producer. Having his first major roles in the 1995 films Dead Presidents and Mr. Holland's Opus, Howard broke into the mainstream with a succession of television and cinema roles between 2004 and 2006. He was nominated for the Academy Award for Best Actor for his role in Hustle & Flow.

Howard has had prominent roles in many other movies, including Winnie Mandela, Ray, Lackawanna Blues, Crash,  Four Brothers, Big Momma's House, Get Rich or Die Tryin', Idlewild, Biker Boyz, August Rush, The Brave One, and Prisoners. Howard played James "Rhodey" Rhodes in the first Iron Man film. He starred as the lead character Lucious Lyon in the television series Empire. His debut album, Shine Through It, was released in September 2008. 

In September 2019, Howard announced that he had retired from acting, as he was "tired of pretending". However, in February 2021, it was announced that Howard would star in the British sci-fi/thriller film Beneath.

In December 2022, he again announced that he was retiring from acting.

Early life 
Howard was born in Chicago, Illinois, on March 11, 1969, to Tyrone and Anita (née Williams) Howard, both of whom were biracial, with African and English ancestry. His great-grandmother was actress Minnie Gentry. Howard was raised in Cleveland, Ohio, where he had a rocky childhood. He endured beatings from his physically abusive father, and saw his father stabbing another man in the Santa Line Slaying when Terrence was two years old. His father was convicted of manslaughter and served 11 months in jail. Howard's parents divorced upon his father's release. He was raised by his great-grandmother. She died at the age of 77 on May 11, 1993.

Career 
Howard first entered the entertainment industry when he portrayed Jackie Jackson in The Jacksons: An American Dream, an ABC miniseries. Three years later, he made his big film break in 1995's Mr. Holland's Opus. He continued being cast in television and movie roles, and co-starred as Greg Sparks in the late-1990s short-lived television series Sparks, with James L. Avery Sr. and Miguel A. Nunez Jr. Howard also appeared in The Best Man (1999), in Ashanti's music video for her 2002 single "Foolish", and in Mary J. Blige's video for "Be Without You". Howard made an appearance on the TV series Family Matters.

Howard has said that he looks for characters that "teach him about himself" when choosing his film roles. For the 2005 film Hustle & Flow, Howard portrayed a pimp and aspiring rapper. He performed all the character's tracks himself, including "It's Hard out Here for a Pimp", which won the Academy Award for Best Original Song at the 78th Academy Awards. Howard has also worked as a film producer, as when he was credited for the 2007 film Pride. In 2008, Howard hosted the PBS series Independent Lens.

Howard was contracted to play Colonel James Rhodes in the 2008 film Iron Man. Howard was signed on before any of the other major actors and was the highest paid actor in the film. He was replaced by actor Don Cheadle in the film's sequels. Entertainment Weekly reported that Howard was offered a 50 to 80 percent pay cut for Iron Man 2, though it said that it was unclear whether Howard turned down the role or whether Marvel withdrew their offer.

Howard released his debut adult alternative album, Shine Through It, in 2008 on Columbia/SME Records. He described the album as urban country, and either wrote or co-wrote all the songs on it.

In 2008, he made his Broadway debut, playing Brick in an all-African-American production of Cat on a Hot Tin Roof, directed by Debbie Allen. During rehearsals, he allegedly attacked and seriously injured musical composer Tex Allen (brother of the director). Allen said he suffered multiple injuries and in October 2008, Allen filed a $5 million lawsuit against Howard. In 2010, Howard joined the cast of Law & Order: Los Angeles, playing Deputy District Attorney Joe Dekker. He alternated shows with Alfred Molina, who portrayed Deputy District Attorney Ricardo Morales. The series was cancelled after one season. In 2011, Howard played Nelson Mandela in the film Winnie Mandela.

Since 2015, Howard has starred on the television series Empire, playing Lucious Lyon, a hip-hop mogul who discovers he is dying and must ensure the survival of his music empire. He also appeared in the television series Wayward Pines portraying Sheriff Arnold Pope, a main character in the first season in 2015 and a guest character in the second and final season.

On hosting the ninth annual Guys Choice Awards in 2015 Howard said "I got the other guy on my side. Big Devil. Big D is my rolling buddy!". At the ceremony he was also awarded Most Dangerous Man.

In September 2019, Howard announced that he had retired from acting after the final season of Empire, as he was "tired of pretending". However, on February 1, 2021, it was announced that Howard would star in British sci-fi/thriller film Beneath. In February 2022, he was cast in the horror film Skeletons in the Closet.

Personal life 
Howard lives outside Philadelphia in Lafayette Hill, Pennsylvania. He has been married five times to three women, and has five children and two grandchildren.

Howard married his first wife, Lori McCommas, in 1993. They divorced in 2001, remarried in 2005, and later divorced again. They had three children together: daughters Aubrey and Heaven, and son Hunter. Through Aubrey, Howard has two grandchildren, a granddaughter born in December 2012 and a grandson (Adrian) born in February 2015. Howard and McCommas' divorce was filed in 2000 and finalized in 2001, but they remarried in 2005. They subsequently filed for divorce a year later and finalized for a second time in 2007.

Howard married his second wife, Michelle Ghent, in 2010. Ghent filed for divorce in February 2011. Ghent filed for a restraining order in December 2011, accusing Howard of being physically abusive toward her. Their divorce was finalized in May 2013, though the agreement was overturned in 2015 after judge ruled Howard had signed it under duress of Ghent threatening to sell nude pictures of Howard and other personal information.

Howard wed his third wife, model and restaurateur Mira Pak, in late 2013. They have two sons, Qirin Love (born 2015) and Hero (born 2016). The two divorced in 2015 and then got engaged to remarry in December 2018.

Howard has stated that he "went to school for chemical engineering and applied materials". Though he did not complete his engineering degree, Howard thinks of himself as an engineer and intends to return one day to complete the "three credits" of which he claims he is currently short. Howard's account of his educational history has not been confirmed; Pratt Institute, which he says he attended, closed its engineering degree program in 1993. On February 26, 2013, Howard also said on Jimmy Kimmel Live! that he had earned a PhD degree in chemical engineering from South Carolina State University (SCSU) that year. He however never attended that university and in fact SCSU does not confer doctorates in chemical engineering. Instead, Howard  was awarded an honorary degree of "Doctorate of Humane Letters" (DHL) from SCSU after speaking at its commencement ceremony in 2012.

In 2010, Howard was inducted as an honorary member into Phi Beta Sigma fraternity.

Terryology 
In a 2015 interview with Rolling Stone, Howard explained that he had formulated his own language of logic, which he called Terryology, and which he was keeping secret until he had patented it. This logic language, he claimed, would be used to prove the statement "".

Howard blames his leaving Pratt over disagreements with a professor regarding this hypothesis. He also stated that he spends many hours a day constructing models of plastic and wire that he patented and claims to confirm his belief.

In 2017, Howard published his "proof" of the claim that "" on his Twitter account. It was heavily criticized as containing multiple logical errors and faulty reasoning.

Abuse and harassment
In February 2009, it was reported on The Smoking Gun that Howard was arrested in 2001 for a variety of charges related to a violent attack on his estranged first wife, including simple assault, terrorist threats, harassment, and stalking. According to police reports, he arrived at her house after an argument on the phone, forced entry into her home by breaking in doors, and chased her into the backyard where he punched her twice in the face with a closed fist. The violent attack ended when Howard's brother stepped in. In 2002, he pleaded guilty to disturbing the peace.

According to The Smoking Gun, Howard was also arrested for assaulting a Continental Airlines flight attendant after refusing her request to return to his seat because the seat belt sign was on.

On December 5, 2011, a judge granted Howard's then-wife Michelle Ghent a restraining order based on her claims that Howard had caused her physical injuries that required medical attention, once broke her computer in half, repeatedly threatened her, and stalked her by telephone and on the Internet.

In August 2013, Ghent obtained a second restraining order against him after showing up in court with a black eye she says he gave her.

In a September 2015 interview with Rolling Stone, Howard admitted to hitting his first wife in 2001 saying, "she was talking to me real strong, and I lost my mind and slapped her in front of the kids."

Filmography

Film

Television

Video games

Music videos

Discography 
Shine Through It (2008)

References

External links 

General
 
 
 'Terrence Howard: One Times One Equals Two' (Official "sacred-math" site for TDS, includes his PDF)
 Terrence Howard UK music website
 Artist of the Month: Terrence Howard at Hyena Productions 
 All African-American production of Cat on a Hot Tin Roof website
 Terrence Howard
Interviews
 Terrence Howard interview by Adam Tanswell, 'Iron Man' December 2008
 Terrence Howard interview by Pete Lewis, 'Blues & Soul' September 2008
 Howard interview, August 2005, Bullz-Eye.com
 Howard interview, July 2005, New York Metro
 Howard interview, May 2005, About.com 
 Terrence Howard interview  on the Tavis Smiley show
 

1969 births
Living people
20th-century American male actors
21st-century American male actors
African-American male actors
African-American male rappers
American male film actors
American male television actors
African-American television producers
Television producers from Illinois
American male video game actors
American male voice actors
Columbia Records artists
Male actors from Chicago
Male actors from Cleveland
Outstanding Performance by a Cast in a Motion Picture Screen Actors Guild Award winners
Pratt Institute alumni
Film producers from Illinois
Film producers from Ohio
21st-century American rappers
People from Montgomery County, Pennsylvania
21st-century American male musicians
20th-century African-American people
21st-century African-American musicians